San Estevan was the first town in the Orange Walk District of the nation of Belize but later became a village due to migration of villagers to other parts of the country during a great epidemic.  According to the 2010 census, it had a population of 1,573 people.  The village is approximately 6 miles northeast from Orange Walk Town.

Most villagers rely on sugar cane as a source of income to their families.  As much as 90% of the villagers own a parcel of sugar cane and are very active cane farmers.  The village is the number one producer of sugar cane in the entire two divisions which are Corozal and Orange Walk.  San Estevan is surrounded by thousands of acres of lush cane plantations.  The New River passes through the left side of the village and the river is still used for transportation of sugar through barges up to Belize City where it is sent abroad.

Sugarcane is cultivated all year long and harvested from November to June.  Cane is delivered to BSI (Belize Sugar Industries) which is located in Orange Walk on the Tower Hill Area.

San Estevan Archaeological Site

Populated places in Orange Walk District